Vaisoori is a Maldivian anthology television series directed by Arifa Ibrahim. Originally aired from 2003 to 2004 on the channel Television Maldives, the series was developed as a 52-episodes series consisting of ten segments.

The longest running segment from the series, "An'dhiri Hayaaiy" consists of 33 episodes and stars Ali Shameel, Nooma Ibrahim, Niuma Mohamed, Ahmed Asim, Aminath Rishfa, Mariyam Sheleen and Sheereen Abdul Wahid in main roles. This segment narrates the downturn of an only child in the family for choosing a path her parents disapproves. This is followed by the segment "Kurin Visnaa Dhevunu Nama", consisting of 9 episodes, which follows the life of a disobedient girl played by Hawwa Enee. The segment "Namoonaa Akah Vaasheve!" was split into three episodes, while "Ih'thiraam Hoadhavaa" was released as two episodes. Rest of the segments were released as a single episode.

Episodes

Soundtrack

Reception
Upon release, the series met with mixed reviews from audience, where the director's effort in working on an anthology series with different creative members and screenwriters were applauded while the screenplay of some segments were noted to be over-dramatic yet appropriate for a soap opera. The series was included in the list of the "finest productions by Arifa Ibrahim".

References

Serial drama television series
Maldivian television shows
Films directed by Arifa Ibrahim